Perry Township is one of twelve townships in Boone County, Indiana. As of the 2010 census, its population was 1,163 and it contained 461 housing units.

History
Howard School was listed on the National Register of Historic Places in 2009.

Geography

Unincorporated towns
 Fayette
 Herr
 Shepherd

Adjacent townships
 Center (northwest)
 Eagle (east)
 Harrison (west)
 Worth (northeast)
 Brown Township, Hendricks County (southeast)
 Middle Township, Hendricks County (southwest)

Major highways
  Interstate 65
  Indiana State Road 267

Cemeteries
The township contains three cemeteries: Dickerson, Howard and Smith.

References
 United States Census Bureau cartographic boundary files
 U.S. Board on Geographic Names

External links

 Indiana Township Association
 United Township Association of Indiana

Townships in Boone County, Indiana
Townships in Indiana